Dimitrios Karagiannis (born 27 February 2001) is a Greek professional footballer who plays as a centre-back for Diagoras.

References

2001 births
Living people
Greek footballers
Super League Greece players
Panathinaikos F.C. players
PAS Giannina F.C. players
Diagoras F.C. players
Association football defenders
People from West Attica
Footballers from Attica